Lee Gwang-yeon (born 11 September 1999) is a South Korean footballer currently playing as a goalkeeper for Gangwon.

Career statistics

Club
.

Notes

References

1999 births
Living people
South Korean footballers
South Korea youth international footballers
Association football goalkeepers
K League 1 players
Gangwon FC players